Tip-Off Girls is a 1938 American crime film directed by Louis King, written by Maxwell Shane, Robert Yost and Stuart Anthony, and starring Mary Carlisle, Lloyd Nolan, Roscoe Karns, Buster Crabbe, J. Carrol Naish, Evelyn Brent and Anthony Quinn. It was released on April 1, 1938, by Paramount Pictures.

Plot

A ring of truck hijackers is organized by Joseph Valkus, run by Red Deegan and fronted by Rena Terry, a woman who pretends to be helpless, tricking truckers to trust her before their shipments are stolen.

Out to bust up the racket, the FBI assigns agents Bob Anders and Tom Benson to go undercover. Pretending to be drivers, then thieves, they gain Valkus's trust. Bob also meets and falls for Marjorie Rogers, a secretary who is totally unaware of the illegal activities.

Bob is overheard tipping off the FBI to the next heist. He is beaten by Valkus's men, but Marjorie manages to write and deliver a note that brings federal agents to the rescue.

Cast 
Mary Carlisle as Marjorie Rogers
Lloyd Nolan as Bob Anders
Roscoe Karns as Tom Benson 
Buster Crabbe as John A. 'Red' Deegan 
J. Carrol Naish as Joseph Valkus
Evelyn Brent as Rena Terry
Anthony Quinn as Marty
Benny Baker as Scotty
Harvey Stephens as Chief Agent Jason Baardue
Irving Bacon as Sam
Gertrude Short as 'Boots' Milburn
Archie Twitchell as Hensler
Barlowe Borland as Blacky
Pierre Watkin as George Murkil

References

External links 
 

1938 films
Paramount Pictures films
American crime films
1938 crime films
Films directed by Louis King
American black-and-white films
1930s English-language films
1930s American films